The following is a bibliography of books in the English language relating to the general topic of Christadelphians.

Bibliography
Alfs, Matthew - Concepts of Father, Son, and Holy Spirit : a classification and description of the Trinitarian and non-Trinitarian theologies existent within Christendom
Andrew, J. J. - Baptismal-Belief
Andrew, J. J. - The Blood of the Covenant
Andrew, J. J. - The Doctrine of Atonement
Arnstein, Walter L. - Protestant Versus Catholic in Mid-Victorian England
Bacon, Graham - The Revelation at a Glance
Bible Companion
Blore, Charles B. - Dr John Thomas: his family and the background of his times
Booker, George - Biblical Fellowship
Booker, George - A New Creation
Boulton, William Henry - Paul the Apostle
Brady, Madalaine Margaret - Christadelphians and conscientious objection to military service in Britain in World War One
Bricknell, John - Do all to the glory of God : a brief account of the formation of the first Christadelphian Ecclesia at Goolwa in South Australia and of the Victor Harbor Christadelphian Ecclesia
Burrell, Maurice C. & John S. Wright - Some modern faiths : (Jehovah's Witnesses, Christadelphians, Christian Scientists, Theosophicalsystems, Mormons, Spiritualists)
Clark, Elmer T. - The Small Sects of America
Collyer, W. Islip - Conviction and Conduct
Collyer, W. Islip - The Guiding Light
Collyer, W. Islip - Robert Roberts: A Study in Life and Character
Cooper, Amy F. - Reframing, regrouping, and empowering : the Christadelphians as a test case for theories about conservative christian women
Encountering new religious movements: a holistic evangelical approach.
Evans, E. R. - Test Case for Canada '3314545'''
Evans, E. R. - "Ye are strangers and sojourners with me": a study of the Christadelphian teaching concerning a Christian's relationship to the stateFadelle, Norman - John Thomas and His Rediscovery of Bible TruthGibson, Arthur - Evolution versus creationGovett, Robert - Christadelphians, not ChristiansAlan Hayward - Creation and EvolutionHayward, Alan - Great news for the worldHayward, Alan - God's TruthHeaster, Duncan - Bible basicsHopkins, Branson - Unmasking Christadelphianism : the hopelessness of the hope House, H. Wayne - Charts of cults, sects & religious movementsHutchins, Leta - ChristadelphiansJannaway, A. T. - The Ground of Resurrectional ResponsibilityJannaway, A. T. - The Inspiration Division, 1884-1921Jannaway, Frank G. - The Bible and How It Came to UsJannaway, Frank G. - The Bible DivineJannaway, Frank G. - The Bible Student in Many LandsJannaway, Frank G. - Bible Times and SeasonsJannaway, Frank G. - British Museum - Bible in HandJannaway, Frank G. - Brother Roberts on CopyrightJannaway, Frank G. - Christ Our PassoverJannaway, Frank G. - Christadelphian Answers on all sorts of DifficultiesJannaway, Frank G., comp. - Christadelphian Facts Concerning Christendeom ... by Dr. J. Thomas ... and other ...ChristadelphiansJannaway, Frank G., comp. - Christadelphian Key to the PropheciesJannaway, Frank G., comp. - Christadelphian TreasuryJannaway, Frank G., comp. - Christadelphians and FellowshipJannaway, Frank G. - Christadelphians and Military ServiceJannaway, Frank G. - Christadelphians on the Great WarJannaway, Frank G. - Christadelphians Then and NowJannaway, Frank G. - Christians not ChristiansJannaway, Frank G. - A Godless SocialismJannaway, Frank G. - A Happy WorldJannaway, Frank G., comp. - How Long?Jannaway, Frank G. - Lest We Forget or Have ForgottenJannaway, Frank G. - Our New BibleJannaway, Frank G. - Ought Christians to Be Socialists?Jannaway, Frank G. - Palestine and the JewsJannaway, Frank G. - Palestine and the PowersJannaway, Frank G. - Palestine and the WorldJannaway, Frank G. - The Salvation Army and the BibleJannaway, Frank G. - Solemn Warning Concerning Christadelphian ApostasyJannaway, Frank G. - Tears of GratitudeJannaway, Frank G. - The Triune God of the Church of EnglandJannaway, Frank G. - Which Is the Remedy - Socialism or the Reign of Christ?Jannaway, Frank G. - Without the camp : being the story of why and how the Christadelphians were exempted from military service Jannaway, Frank G. - The Worst Enemies of the BibleKeele, G. T. - Truth and ErrorLea, John W. - The Life and Writings of Dr. ThomasLippy, Charles H. - The Christadelphians in North AmericaLo Bello, Kristin Anne - The Christadelphians: the true fundamentalistsMacGregor, Lorri - Christadelphians and ChristianityMcHaffie, Averil and Iam McHaffie - 150 years : a very brief history of Edinburgh Christadelphian Ecclesia (1853-2003)McHaffie, Ruth - Brethren indeed?: Christadelphians and "outsiders" (16th-21st century)McHaffie, Ruth - Finding founders and facing factsMcHaffie, Ruth - Timewatching - and Israel. Volume 1. ExpectationsMitchell, Thomas S. - I am a conscientious objector : explaining the position of those who by reason of their religious training and belief, support the tenets of the Christadelphian faithMorgan, James Logan - Christadelphians in Arkansas, 1968.Nicholls, Alfred - Remember the days of old: twelve editorial articles from the Christadelphian Norris, A. D. - The Apocalypse for Every ManNorris, A. D. - The Things We Stand ForNorris, A. D. - Understanding the BibleNorris, E. - The courts of the womenOne Hundred Years of the ChristadelphianPanton, D. M. - Satanic CounterfeitsPollock. A. J. - Christadelphianism Astray from the BiblePollock, A. J. - Christadelphianism: briefly tested by scritpturePowell, J. W. - The historical record of the Sydney Central Christadelphian Ecclesia, 1864 to 1990 : compiled by J.W. PowellPoynter, J. W. - ChristadelphiansismProctor, Don - The Christadelphians : are they of the household of faith? Roberts, Robert - Christendom Astray from the BibleRoberts, Robert - Christ's Doctrine of Eternal LifeRoberts, Robert - Coming Events in the EastRoberts, Robert - A Declaration of First Principles of the Oracles of the DeityRoberts, Robert - Dr. Thomas: His Life and workRoberts, Robert - England and EgyptRoberts, Robert - England's RuinRoberts, Robert - Epitome of the Commandments of ChristRoberts, Robert - Everlasting Punishments Not Eternal TormentsRoberts, Robert - The Kingdom of GodRoberts, Robert - The Law of MosesRoberts, Robert - Robert Roberts, Born 1839 - Died 1898Roberts, Robert - The Sect Everywhere Spoken AboutRoberts, Robert - The Slain LambRoberts, Robert - The TrialRoberts, Robert - The Truth in the Nineteenth CenturyRoberts, Robert - Was Jesus of Nazareth the Messiah?Roberts, Robert - Ways of ProvidenceRoberts, Robert & J. Andrew - Resurrectional Responsibilities DebateRoberts, Robert and C. C. Walker - The Ministry of the ProphetsRumble, Leslie - The anti-immortals : a reply to the Rationalists, Jehovah Witnesses, Adventists and ChristadelphiansTennant, Harry - The Christadelphians: what they believe and preachThomas, John - The Apostasy UnveiledThomas, John - The Book UnsealedThomas, John - CatechesisThomas, John - "The Destiny of Human Governments in the Light of Scripute
Thomas, John - The Destiny of the British Empire as revealed in the Scriptures
Thomas, John - Elpis Israel
Thomas, John - Eureka
Thomas, John - The Faith in the Last Days
Thomas, John - The Holy Spirit Not a Present Possession
Thomas, John - Odology: An Antidote to Spiritualism
Thomas, John - Phanerosis - Exosition of the doctrine of the Old Testament
Thomas, John - The Revealed Mystery
Thomas, John - The Roman Question or the Fall of the Papacy
Thomas, John - What Is the Truth?
Thomas, John - Who Are the Christadelphians?
Thompson, William Lester - A study of the theology of Dr. John Thomas, founder of the Christadelphians
Turner, F. W. - The Exclusiveness of Christianity
Turney, Edward - Ereuna: being an answer to R. Govett's "Christadelphians not Christians." 
Walker, C. C. - Rome and the Christadelphians
Walker, C. C. - The Word of God
Walker, Joseph Viccars - The Christadelphians and their doctrine
Whittaker, Harry - Letters to George and Jenny : a book for young Christadelphians
Williams, Thomas - Life and Work of Thomas Williams
Wilson, Andrew R. - The history of the Christadelphians, 1864-1885 : the emergence of a denomination 
Wilson, Bryan R. - Sects and society: a sociological study of the Elim Tabernacle, Christian Science, and Christadelphians
Yearsley, W. R. - Working with the grain : chips and sawdust at the bench and the cross grain of life : reflections on secular and spiritual values, a family record

Christadelphianism
Christadelphians